Srećko Mitrović (born 17 February 1984) is an Australian football player of Bosnian Serb descent, who last played for Geelong SC in the National Premier Leagues Victoria 2.

Career
Born in Zenica, SR Bosnia and Herzegovina, when part of Yugoslavia, Srećko Mitrović started his playing career at Marconi Stallions in 2000, at the age of 16. In 2001, while he was only 17, Mitrović was bought by the Italian Serie A club Piacenza. In 2002, he signed a five-year deal with Italian Serie B club Ascoli. After three years playing for Ascoli. he was shortly on loan in Morro d'Oro in Serie C.

In 2006 Mitrović moved to Romanian Liga I by signing a contract with Poli Iaşi.

In 2009, he went back to Australia, and for six months he was playing for Sutherland Sharks, before he moved to East Bengal in the Indian I-League. In October, 2010 Mitrović signed a contract with Indonesian team PSM Makassar, he moved to Deltras in 2012.

In the summer of 2017, he returned to Europe and signed with Serbian third-tier side FK Cement Beočin.

In 2019, Mitrović returned to Australia, signing for Victorian club Geelong SC in the National Premier Leagues Victoria 2.

Honours
Sutherland Sharks
NSW Premier League (1): 2009

References

1984 births
Living people
Sportspeople from Zenica
Serbs of Bosnia and Herzegovina
Australian people of Serbian descent
Australian soccer players
Australian expatriate soccer players
Ascoli Calcio 1898 F.C. players
Liga I players
Expatriate footballers in Romania
Australian expatriate sportspeople in Romania
Expatriate footballers in India
Expatriate footballers in Indonesia
Association football midfielders
East Bengal Club players
Australian expatriate sportspeople in India
Liga 1 (Indonesia) players
Deltras F.C. players
PSM Makassar players
Australian expatriate sportspeople in Indonesia
Bosnia and Herzegovina emigrants to Australia
FK Cement Beočin players